Sorbitol, less commonly known as glucitol, is a sugar alcohol with a sweet taste which the human body metabolizes slowly. It can be obtained by reduction of glucose, which changes the converted aldehyde group (−CHO) to a primary alcohol group (−CH2OH). Most sorbitol is made from potato starch, but it is also found in nature, for example in apples, pears, peaches, and prunes. It is converted to fructose by sorbitol-6-phosphate 2-dehydrogenase. Sorbitol is an isomer of mannitol, another sugar alcohol; the two differ only in the orientation of the hydroxyl group on carbon 2. While similar, the two sugar alcohols have very different sources in nature, melting points, and uses.

As an over-the-counter drug, sorbitol is used as a laxative to treat constipation.

Synthesis

Sorbitol may be synthesised via a glucose reduction reaction in which the converted aldehyde group is converted into a hydroxyl group. The reaction requires NADH and is catalyzed by aldose reductase. Glucose reduction is the first step of the polyol pathway of glucose metabolism, and is implicated in multiple diabetic complications.

The mechanism involves a tyrosine residue in the active site of aldehyde reductase. The hydrogen atom on NADH is transferred to the electrophilic aldehyde carbon atom; electrons on the aldehyde carbon-oxygen double bond are transferred to the oxygen that abstracts the proton on tyrosine side chain to form the hydroxyl group. The role of aldehyde reductase tyrosine phenol group is to serve as a general acid to provide proton to the reduced aldehyde oxygen on glucose.

Glucose reduction is not the major glucose metabolism pathway in a normal human body, where the glucose level is in the normal range. However, in diabetic patients whose blood glucose level is high, up to 1/3 of their glucose could go through the glucose reduction pathway. This will consume NADH and eventually leads to cell damage.
Sorbitol also may be synthesized through a catalytic hydrogenation of d-glucose to form d-sorbitol. This reaction has a 100% yield of d-sorbitol when d-glucose is reacted with hydrogen in water at 120 degrees Celsius, under 150001.5 Torr, for 1 hour.

Uses

Sweetener
Sorbitol is a sugar substitute, and when used in food it has the INS number and E number 420. Sorbitol is about 60% as sweet as sucrose (table sugar).

Sorbitol is referred to as a nutritive sweetener because it provides dietary energy: 2.6 kilocalories (11 kilojoules) per gram versus the average 4 kilocalories (17 kilojoules) for carbohydrates. It is often used in diet foods (including diet drinks and ice cream), mints, cough syrups, and sugar-free chewing gum. Most bacteria cannot use sorbitol for energy, but it can be slowly fermented in the mouth by Streptococcus mutans, a bacterium that causes tooth decay.  In contrast, many other sugar alcohols such as isomalt and xylitol are considered non-acidogenic.

It also occurs naturally in many stone fruits and berries from trees of the genus Sorbus.

Medical applications

Laxative
As is the case with other sugar alcohols, foods containing sorbitol can cause gastrointestinal distress. Sorbitol can be used as a laxative when taken orally or as an enema. Sorbitol works as a laxative by drawing water into the large intestine, stimulating bowel movements.  Sorbitol has been determined safe for use by the elderly, although it is not recommended without the advice of a physician. 

Sorbitol is commonly used orally as a one-time dose of  70% solution. It may also be used as a one-time rectal enema.

Other medical applications
Sorbitol is used in bacterial culture media to distinguish the pathogenic Escherichia coli O157:H7 from most other strains of E. coli, because it is usually unable to ferment sorbitol, unlike 93% of known E. coli strains.

A treatment for hyperkalaemia (elevated blood potassium) uses sorbitol and the ion-exchange resin sodium polystyrene sulfonate (tradename Kayexalate).  The resin exchanges sodium ions for potassium ions in the bowel, while sorbitol helps to eliminate it. In 2010, the U.S. FDA issued a warning of increased risk for gastrointestinal necrosis with this combination.

Sorbitol is also used in the manufacture of softgel capsules to store single doses of liquid medicines.

Health care, food, and cosmetic uses
Sorbitol often is used in modern cosmetics as a humectant and thickener. It is also used in mouthwash and toothpaste. Some transparent gels can be made only with sorbitol, because of its high refractive index.

Sorbitol is used as a cryoprotectant additive (mixed with sucrose and sodium polyphosphates) in the manufacture of surimi, a processed fish paste. It is also used as a humectant in some cigarettes.

Beyond its use as a sugar substitute in reduced-sugar foods, sorbitol is also used as a humectant in cookies and low-moisture foods like peanut butter and fruit preserves. In baking, it is also valuable because it acts as a plasticizer, and slows down the staling process.

Miscellaneous uses
A mixture of sorbitol and potassium nitrate has found some success as an amateur solid rocket fuel.

Sorbitol is identified as a potential key chemical intermediate for production of fuels from biomass resources. Carbohydrate fractions in biomass such as cellulose undergo sequential hydrolysis and hydrogenation in the presence of metal catalysts to produce sorbitol. Complete reduction of sorbitol opens the way to alkanes, such as hexane, which can be used as a biofuel. Hydrogen required for this reaction can be produced by aqueous phase catalytic reforming of sorbitol.

19 C6H14O6 → 13 C6H14 + 36 CO2 + 42 H2O

The above chemical reaction is exothermic, and 1.5 moles of sorbitol generate approximately 1 mole of hexane. When hydrogen is co-fed, no carbon dioxide is produced.

Sorbitol based polyols are used in the production of polyurethane foam for the construction industry.

It is also added after electroporation of yeasts in transformation protocols, allowing the cells to recover by raising the osmolarity of the medium.

Medical importance
Aldose reductase is the first enzyme in the sorbitol-aldose reductase pathway responsible for the reduction of glucose to sorbitol, as well as the reduction of galactose to galactitol. Too much sorbitol trapped in retinal cells, the cells of the lens, and the Schwann cells that myelinate peripheral nerves, is a frequent result of long-term hyperglycemia that accompanies poorly controlled diabetes. This can damage these cells, leading to retinopathy, cataracts and peripheral neuropathy, respectively. 

Sorbitol is fermented in the colon and produces short-chain fatty acids, which are beneficial to overall colon health.

Potential adverse effects
Sorbitol may cause allergic reactions in some people. Common side effects from use as a laxative are stomach cramps, vomiting, diarrhea or rectal bleeding.

Compendial status
 Food Chemicals Codex
 European Pharmacopoeia 6.1
 British Pharmacopoeia 2009
 Japanese Pharmacopoeia 17

See also
Sorbitan
Isosorbide

References

External links

Commodity chemicals
E-number additives
Excipients
Laxatives
Osmotic diuretics
Sugar alcohols
Sugar substitutes